Territory is the third full-length studio album by Canadian indie rock band Two Hours Traffic, and the follow-up to their Polaris Prize-nominated Little Jabs. It was released on September 8, 2009 on Bumstead Records. The album was produced by Joel Plaskett. The band toured Canada in September and October 2009 in support of the album.

Reception 
Writing for The Georgia Straight, Adrian Mack called the album a "gorgeous and defiantly old-fashioned album". Writing for PopMatters, Zachary Houle called the album "a little half-baked" but provided a lukewarm recommendation.

Writing for AllMusic, Ned Raggett gave the album 3.5 stars out of five.

Track listing 
 "Noisemaker"
 "Wicked Side"
 "Territory"
 "Weightless One"
 "Painted Halo"
 "Just Listen"
 "Drop Alcohol"
 "Monster Closet"
 "Lost Boys"
 "Happiness Burns"
 "Sing a Little Hymn"
 "Night's Too Short" (bonus track)

Personnel 
 Two Hours Traffic:
Liam Corcoran – lead vocals, guitar
 Alec O'Hanley – guitars, keys, vocals
 Derek Ellis – drums
 Andrew MacDonald – bass, vocals
 Guests:
 Joel Plaskett – guitars
 Anna Plaskett – French horn
 Molly Rankin – vocals
 Production
 Joel Plaskett - producer
 Howard Redekopp - mixer

References

External links
 Streaming album at TwoHoursTraffic.com

2009 albums
Two Hours Traffic albums